Jatropha podagrica is a succulent plant in the family Euphorbiaceae. It is native to the tropical Americas but is grown as an ornamental plant in many parts of the world due to its unusual appearance. Common names include Gout Plant, Gout Stalk, Guatemalan Rhubarb, Coral Plant, Buddha Belly Plant, Purging-Nut, Physic Nut, Goutystalk Nettlespurge, Australian Bottle Plant, and Tartogo.

Description
J. podagrica is a caudiciform perennial herb growing up to 1 metre (3 feet) tall. The grey-green, knobby, swollen caudex has a bottle-like appearance, giving rise to some of the common names. Leaves are held on long fleshy yet stout petioles which emerge from the tip of the stem and radiate in all directions. Leaves are peltate and 3 or 5 lobed. Dense clusters of small, orange-red, flowers are held above the leaves on long slim peduncles. The clusters carry both male and female flowers and flowering continues for most of the year. Fruit are green capsules at first, becoming blackish-brown at maturity, when they explode and scatter their seeds up to 4 metres (13 feet) away.

When cut, the plant exudes a copious sticky sap which may cause dermatitis on contact.

Cultivation
The swollen caudex, showy leaves, and colourful flowers make J. podagrica an attractive ornamental, and it is grown as an indoor plant in many parts of the world.

Uses
There are many uses of J. podagrica in folk medicine, including as an analgesic, tonic, aphrodisiac, purgative, laxative, and to treat infections, intestinal worms, snakebite, gout, and more. Other uses include tanning, dye making, soap making, biofuel, fish poison, lamp lighting, and fertiliser.

Additionally, a number of research projects have sought to identify medicinally useful compounds from J. podagrica.

Toxicity
All parts of the plant are considered toxic, in particular the seeds. The main toxins are a purgative oil and a phytotoxin or toxalbumin (curcin) similar to ricin in Ricinis.

Galleries

References

podagrica
Caudiciform plants
House plants
Flora of Central America